Four Palaces is a major denomination of the Mother Goddess religion, an indigenous polytheistic religion in Vietnam. This branch is popular in the North of Vietnam and has a profound association with the worship of Đức Thánh Trần.

Its name literally means "Four Palaces" as its deities are believed to reside in four palaces, each of which serves as a ministry governing one realm of the universe.

There are four realms: Heaven, Earth, Water and Mountains. The palaces governing those realms are named as follows:

 Thiên phủ (Heaven Palace): ruled by Mother Goddess of Heaven (Mẫu Đệ Nhất Thiên Tiên)
 Địa phủ (Earth Palace): ruled by Mother Goddess of Earth (Mẫu Đệ Nhị Địa Tiên), also known as Mother Goddess Liễu Hạnh.
 Thoải phủ (Water Palace): ruled by Mother Goddess of Water (Mẫu Đệ Tam Thuỷ Tiên), also known as Mother Goddess of Water Residence (Thủy Cung Thánh Mẫu).
 Nhạc phủ (Mountains Palace): ruled by Mother Goddess of Mountains (Mẫu Đệ Tứ Nhạc Tiên), also known as Mother Goddess of Forest Residence (Lâm Cung Thánh Mẫu)

The Pantheon of Four Palaces 
The pantheon of Four Palaces includes the following ranks. While the hierarchy and names of the ranks are widely recognized and agreed upon, each rank might have some variations which include a different number of deities or a deity could have various stories and biographies. The belief is that a deity could manifest in various historic figures.

For the ranks with many variations, the first three or four figures are usually widely recognized and venerated, with the first position of Heaven, the second of High Mountains, the third of Water and the fourth as an Imperial Commissioner. The deities after the third or fourth position may have different names, titles and stories.

Mother Goddesses (Thánh Mẫu)

First Mother Goddess of Heaven (Mẫu Đệ Nhất Thiên Tiên) 

The First Mother Goddess of Heaven is also addressed as the Mother Goddess of Nine Heavens. Since she resides in the far-away Heaven Palace, it's believed that she authorized Mother Goddess Liễu Hạnh, who is the Mother Goddess of Earth herself, to present her on Earth. Therefore, people are familiar with the concept of the Triad of Four Palaces Mother Goddesses even though there are four Mother Goddesses of Four Palaces.

Second Mother Goddess of Earth (Mẫu Đệ Nhị Địa Tiên) 
The Second Mother Goddess of Earth is Mother Goddess Liễu Hạnh.

Third Mother Goddess of Water (Mẫu Đệ Tam Thuỷ Tiên)

The common short title is Mother Goddess of Water (Mẫu Thoải).

Fourth Mother Goddess of Mountains (Mẫu Đệ Tứ Nhạc Tiên)

Venerable Mandarins (Quan Lớn) 
This rank is usually referred to as the Five Venerable Mandarins (Ngũ Vị Tôn Quan). There is also another less common form of Ten Venerable Mandarins (Thập Vị Tôn Quan), where the multiple of the number 5 appears.

First Venerable Mandarin of Heaven (Quan Lớn Đệ Nhất Thượng Thiên) 

His full title is the First Crown Prince and Princely Mandarin of Heaven (Đệ Nhất Thượng Thiên Hoàng Thái Tử Vương Quan)

Second Venerable Mandarin of Mountains and Forests, Supreme Commander (Quan Lớn Đệ Nhị Thượng Ngàn Thanh Tra) 

His full title is the Second Crown Prince and Princely Mandarin of Mountains and Forests (Đệ Nhị Thượng Ngàn Hoàng Thái Tử Vương Quan)

Third Venerable Mandarin of Water Palace (Quan Lớn Đệ Tam Thuỷ Phủ) 

His full title is the Third Crown Prince and Princely Mandarin of Water Palace (Đệ Tam Thoải Phủ Hoàng Thái Tử Vương Quan).

Fourth Venerable Mandarin of Earth, Imperial Commissioner (Quan Lớn Đệ Tứ Địa Phủ Khâm Sai)

Fifth Venerable Mandarin, Inspector General (Quan Lớn Đệ Ngũ Giám Sát) 

His other title is the Fifth Venerable Mandarin, Governor of the Humans Realm (Quan Lớn Đệ Ngũ Nhân Vi Chủ Quản.

Holy Courtier (Thánh Chầu) 
Most of the devotees of Four Palaces refer to this rank as the Twelve Court Dames.

First Courtier of Heaven (Chầu Đệ Nhất Thượng Thiên)

Second Courtier of Mountains and Forests (Chầu Đệ Nhị Thượng Ngàn)

Third Courtier of Water Palace (Chầu Đệ Tam Thoải Cung)

Fourth Courtier, Imperial Commissioner (Chầu Đệ Tứ Khâm Sai)

Fifth Courtier of the Lân Stream (Chầu Năm Suối Lân)

Sixth Courtier of Six Residences (Chầu Sáu Lục Cung)

Seventh Courtier of Kim Giao (Chầu Bảy Kim Giao)

Eighth Courtier Bát Ngàn (Chầu Bát Ngàn)

Ninth Courtier of Nine Wells (Chầu Chín Cửu Tỉnh)

Tenth Courtier of Đồng Mỏ (Chầu Mười Đồng Mỏ)

Little Courtier of Bắc Lệ (Chầu Bé Bắc Lệ)

Local Courtier of the Shrine (Chầu Bà Bản Đền Bản Cảnh)

Holy Princes (Thánh Hoàng) 
This rank is usually referred to as the Ten of Princes.

First Prince of Heaven (Ông Hoàng Cả Thượng Thiên)

Second Prince, Imperial Commissioner (Ông Hoàng Đôi Khâm Sai)

Third Prince of Water Palace (Ông Hoàng Bơ Thoải Phủ)

Fourth Prince (Ông Hoàng Tư)

Fifth Prince (Ông Hoàng Năm)

Sixth Prince (Ông Hoàng Sáu)

Seventh Prince of Bảo Hà (Ông Hoàng Bảy Bảo Hà) 

The Seventh Prince of Bảo Hà is among the Holy Princes of the Four Palaces - Mother Goddess religion. The rank of Holy Princes follows the rank of Holy Courtiers and before the rank of Holy Mistresses. The 7th or 17th of the Seventh lunisolar month is considered the time to honor the Seventh Prince

Priests are usually approved to serve His reflection in a hầu bóng (serving the reflection) ceremony.

It is told that under the reign of Emperor Lê Hiển Tông (1740 - 1786), the Bảo Hà region (nowaday Bảo Hà commune, Bảo Yên district, Lào Cai province) and the northern border were usually in dangerous situations. The Chinese enemy's ambition to invade and the clan chiefs’ aggression towards each other threatened the national security.

The imperial court assigned a renowned military general whose last name is Nguyễn to this area in order to secure the border. Under His brilliant leadership, the enemy from the north was defeated and the clan chiefs finally stopped their hostility to each other. Since then Bảo Hà became one of the most critical military bases defending the nation's border.

Eventually, the brave general died in a bloody battle. The moment He was killed by the enemy, the wind started to pick up and the clouds to roll in forming into a shape of a horse in the sky. The horse radiated an aura then flied to Bảo Hà. When it reached Bảo Hà; the sky suddenly got clear and five-colored clouds turned into the Four Divine Beasts.

Meanwhile, His body also flew on the river to the same location. The local people, with their deep laments for the brave and courageous general, built a shrine in His honor.

Eighth Prince (Ông Hoàng Tám)

Ninth Prince of the Cờn Estuary (Ông Hoàng Chín Cờn Môn)

Tenth Prince of Nghệ An (Ông Hoàng Mười Nghệ An)

Holy Mistresses (Thánh Cô) 
It is widely recognized that there are twelve Mistresses in this rank. Similar to the rank of Court Dames, other Mistresses from various towns are also considered to belong to this rank.

First Mistress of Heaven (Cô Đệ Nhất Thượng Thiên)

Second Mistress of Mountains and Forests (Cô Đôi Thượng Ngàn)

Third Mistress of Water Palace (Cô Bơ Thoải Cung)

Fourth Mistress of Earth Palace (Cô Tư Địa Phủ) 

Some people believe that the Fourth Mistress of Earth Palace is worshipped at the Ỷ La Shrine, thus the title the Fourth Mistress of Ỷ La. However, some others believe that the Fourth Mistress of Ỷ La is among the Twelve Goddesses of Mountains Village.

Another title of the Fourth Mistress of Earth Palace is the Fourth Mistress of West Lake's Four Villages (Cô Tư Tứ Tổng Tây Hồ).

Note: She is not the same with the Fourth Mistress of Ỷ La who is one of the twelve Fairies of Mountains and Forests.

Fifth Mistress of the Lân Stream (Cô Năm Suối Lân)

Sixth Mistress of Mountains Village (Cô Sáu Sơn Trang)

Seventh Mistress of Kim Giao (Cô Bảy Kim Giao)

Eighth Mistress of Tea Hills (Cô Tám Đồi Chè)

Ninth Mistress of Mount Sòng  (Cô Chín Sòng Sơn)

Tenth Mistress of Đồng Mỏ (Cô Mười Đồng Mỏ)

Little Mistresses of Mountains and Forests (Cô Bé Thượng Ngàn) 
Each region usually has its own young female deity/deities. These young goddesses are believed to follow the Mother Goddess of Mountains and Forests in the Mountains Palace. They are the "Local Mistresses". One would be named "The Little Mistress of [name of the region]".

Little Mistresses of Water

Holy Masters (Thánh Cậu) 
Little is known about the rank of the Holy Masters. They are usually young squires who attend on the Princes.

The popular Masters include:

First Master of Mount Sòng/ First Master of Dầy Palace

Second Master 
He is believed to reside in Mount Sòng, Phố Cát, Ngang Hill.

Third Master 
He attends on the Father Emperor of Water Palace, Mother Goddess of Water Palace or Third Prince of Water.

Fourth Master 
He attends on the Fourth Grand Mandarin or the Fourth Courtier, both are the Imperial Commissioners

Little Master of Ngang Hill 
He was a son to Mother Goddess Liễu Hạnh in her third incarnation

Local Masters 
Each shrine might have its own Young Master.

Five Tigers (Ngũ Hổ) and Ông Lốt

References

Vietnamese folk religion